Anna of Saxony (1544–1577), was the daughter of Maurice, Elector of Saxony and wife of William the Silent.

Anna of Saxony may also refer to:
 , daughter of Albert II, Duke of Saxony, wife of Henry II, Lord of Mecklenburg
  (died 1395), Duchess of Saxe-Wittenberg as wife of Rudolf III, daughter of Balthasar, Landgrave of Thuringia
 Anna of Saxe-Wittenberg (died 1426), wife of Duke Frederick I of Brunswick-Lüneburg, a German anti-king
 Anna of Saxony, Landgravine of Hesse (1420–1462), wife of Landgrave Louis III of Hesse
 Anna of Saxony, Electress of Brandenburg (1437–1512), daughter of Frederick II, Elector of Saxony and wife of Albert III, Margrave of Brandenburg
 Anne of Denmark, Electress of Saxony (1532–1585)
 Anna of Saxony (1567–1613), by marriage Duchess of Saxe-Coburg-Eisenach
 Princess Anna of Saxony (1836–1859), daughter of John of Saxony, wife of Archduke Ferdinand, Hereditary Prince of Tuscany
 Princess Anna of Saxony (1903–1976), daughter of Frederick Augustus III of Saxony, wife of Archduke Joseph Francis of Austria

See also 
 Maria Anna of Saxony (disambiguation)
 Princess Anna Sophie of Denmark (1647–1717), Electress of Saxony
 Anna Sophie of Saxe-Gotha-Altenburg (1670–1728)